Hiski Salomaa (born Hiskias Möttö; May 17, 1891 – July 7, 1957) was a Finnish-American singer and songwriter.

Career

Referred to as the Finnish Woody Guthrie, Salomaa's songs portrayed the immigrant experience of working-class Finns.

Between 1927 and 1931 Salomaa recorded eighteen sides for Columbia Records.

Since the 1970s, Hiski Salomaa's recordings have been reissued in both analog and digital formats. In 1992 his song "Värssyjä sieltä ja täältä" (Verses from Here and There) was published in Mel Bay’s Immigrant Songbook, an American songbook with lyrics in both Finnish and English.

References

External links 
Text of Lännen Lokari
 CD with Lännen Lokari

1891 births
1957 deaths
People from Kangasniemi
People from Mikkeli Province (Grand Duchy of Finland)
American conscientious objectors
American folk singers
American male songwriters
Finnish emigrants to the United States
Finnish emigrants to the United States (1809–1917)
Industrial Workers of the World members
20th-century American singers
20th-century American male singers